Ana Medina is Venezuela's ambassador to Poland appointed by the National Assembly during the Venezuelan presidential crisis on 19 March 2019.

See also 
 Juan Guaidó
 Poland–Venezuela relations

References

External links 
 Embajada en Polonia, Presidencia Venezuela

Ambassadors to Poland
Ambassadors of Venezuela
Women ambassadors
Living people
Year of birth missing (living people)
Place of birth missing (living people)